Walter Gautschi (born December 11, 1927) is a Swiss-American mathematician, known for his contributions to numerical analysis. He has authored over 200 papers in his
area and published four books.

Born in Basel, he has a Ph.D. in mathematics from the University of Basel on the thesis Analyse graphischer Integrationsmethoden advised by Alexander Ostrowski and Andreas Speiser (1953).
Since then, he did postdoctoral work as a Janggen-Pöhn Research
Fellow at the Istituto Nazionale per le Applicazioni del Calcolo in Rome (1954) and at the Harvard Computation Laboratory (1955).
He had positions at the National Bureau of Standards (1956–59), 
the American University in Washington D.C., 
the Oak Ridge National Laboratory (1959–63) before joining
Purdue University where he has worked from 1963 to 2000 and now
being professor emeritus.
He has been a Fulbright Scholar at the Technical University of Munich (1970) and held visiting appointments at the
University of Wisconsin–Madison (1976), Argonne National Laboratory, the Wright-Patterson Air Force Base, 
ETH Zurich (1996-2001), the University of Padova (1997), and the University of Basel (2000).

As well-known (e.g. Gerhard Wanner, Geneva ca. 2011 and the well-known first-hand sources and subsequent reports such as Math. Intelligencer, etc), one of Gautschi's most important contributions on numerical simulation of special functions offered evidence and confidence to de Branges's tour-de-force attack on the elusive Bieberbach conjecture on the magnitude of coefficients of schlicht functions, which hitherto received only slow, difficult and partial progress by work of Bieberbach, Loewner, Gabaredian and Schiffer.

Books
Colloquium approximatietheorie, MC Syllabus 14, Mathematisch Centrum Amsterdam, 1971. With H. Bavinck and G. M. Willems
Numerical analysis: an introduction, Birkhäuser, Boston, 1997; 2nd edition, 2012.
Orthogonal polynomials: computation and approximation, Oxford University Press, Oxford, 2004.
Walter Gautschi, Selected Works with Commentaries, Springer Science & Business Media, 2013, 3 vols., Brezinski, Claude, and Ahmed Sameh, eds.
 volume 1; volume 2; volume 3
Orthogonal polynomials in MATLAB: exercises and solutions, SIAM, Philadelphia, 2016.

Surveys
 Gander, W., & Gautschi, W. (2000). Adaptive quadrature—revisited. BIT Numerical Mathematics, 40(1), 84-101.
 Gautschi, W. (1996). Orthogonal polynomials: applications and computation. Acta Numerica, 5, 45-119.
 Gautschi, W. (1981). A survey of Gauss-Christoffel quadrature formulae. In EB Christoffel (pp. 72-147). Birkhäuser, Basel.
 Gautschi, W. (1967). Computational aspects of three-term recurrence relations. SIAM Review, 9(1), 24-82.

References

External links
 
 

Swiss mathematicians
Scientists from Basel-Stadt
Harvard University staff
Academic staff of the Technical University of Munich
Swiss emigrants to the United States
University of Wisconsin–Madison faculty
Academic staff of the University of Padua
20th-century American mathematicians
21st-century American mathematicians
University of Basel alumni
Purdue University faculty
1927 births
Living people
Fellows of the Society for Industrial and Applied Mathematics